Emmanuel Alayande University of Education formerly Emmanuel Alayande College of Education and Oyo State College of Education also known as EACOED or EAUE is a state-owned University of Education located in Oyo, Oyo State, Nigeria and recently changed to a university by Oyo State Governor, Engineer Seyi Makinde in 2022.

Historical background 

At inception, St. Andrews College, Oyo produced holders of Grade II Teachers Certificate while the Divinity Course for training church ministers was added to the curriculum between 1910 and 1942, and the proprietorship of the College was transferred from CMS, London to the Church of Nigeria (Anglican Communion).

In 1977, Government took over the control and administration of all schools in the Nigerian Federation and with this development, the Church of Nigeria was divested of her Proprietorship of the College. However, the St. Andrews College Old Boys Association (SACOBA) interest and by extension that of the Church, in the growth and development of St. Andrews did not wane. Thus, in response to SACOBA's petition, the erstwhile Oyo State Government upgraded the Institution to NCE campus in 1980 and to the full-fledged College of Education in 1985.

However, in December 02, 2022, Governor Seyi Makinde of Oyo State upgraded the institution from being a College of Education to a University of Education.

Programmes 

 Nigerian Certificate in Education (NCE)
 Yoruba Language Proficiency Programme (YLP)
 Ekiti State University (affiliated Degree Programmes)

References 
 
Economic Department 2015/2016

External links 

 Emmanuel Alayande College of Education Official Website

Universities and colleges in Nigeria